The women's long jump at the 2022 World Athletics Indoor Championships took place on 20 March 2022.

Results
The final was started at 17:37.

References

Long jump
Long jump at the World Athletics Indoor Championships